Sweet chili sauce (also known as Thai Sweet chili sauce), known as  in Thailand, is a popular chili sauce condiment in Thai, Afghan, Malaysian, and Western cuisine. It is commonly made with red chili peppers (often Fresno chile, Thai or red jalapeños), rice wine vinegar, sometimes garlic, sometimes fish sauce, and a sweetening ingredient such as fruit or a refined sugar or honey.

It is popular as a dip in European Chinese restaurant dishes such as prawn toast, egg rolls, lettuce wraps, chicken wings and spring rolls. It can also be purchased in bottle form. In Australia, New Zealand, Europe, Canada, and the United States, "sweet Thai chili sauce" is available as a condiment at many takeaway stores and supermarkets.

See also
 Chili oil, a condiment made from chili and oil that adds heat to Asian dishes
 Nam chim, various Thai dipping sauces
 Nước chấm, Vietnamese sauce that has similar ingredients to sweet chili sauce but is more spicy and vinegary, and less sweet and thick in texture
 Nam phrik, various Thai chili pastes
 Sriracha, a Thai condiment sauce made from chilies that adds heat to a dish
 List of dips
 List of sauces

References

External links
Recipe for Sweet Chilli Sauce

Chili sauce and paste